Filippos Filippou may refer to:

Filippos Filippou (runner) (born 1956), Cypriot long-distance runner
Filippos Filippou (footballer) (born 1975), Cypriot footballer